Eric Christian William Krenz (May 7, 1906 – August 18, 1931) was an American shot putter and discus thrower. Krenz set two world records in the discus and was considered a favorite for the 1932 Summer Olympics, but his career was cut short when he drowned at age 25.

Biography

Krenz was one of the leading stars of coach Dink Templeton's Stanford University team. He won the discus throw at the 1927 national championships with a throw of 44.75 m (146 ft 10 in). In April 1928, he threw beyond Bud Houser's official discus world record of  several times in practice.

Krenz won both of his events at the 1928 IC4A Championships, leading Stanford to their second straight team championship. He also won the discus at the 1928 NCAA Championships and placed second in the shot, helping Stanford win that team title as well with a record 72 points. Krenz was heavily favored to make the US Olympic team in the discus; however, at the Olympic Trials he was only successful in the shot put, placing fourth to just make the team. Team leaders considered entering him in both events anyway, but eventually decided not to.  Krenz placed fourth in the Olympic shot put final, behind teammates Johnny Kuck and Herman Brix and Germany's Emil Hirschfeld. 

Krenz officially broke the discus world record in March 1929, adding more than five feet to Houser's mark with a throw of 49.90 m (163 ft  in). He repeated as IC4A discus champion, helping Stanford win the team title by the largest margin in 30 years. He also regained his national discus title, throwing a new meeting record of 47.90 m (157 ft 2 in). At the NCAA Championships, however, he only managed 2nd in the shot and 6th in the discus.

Krenz became the first man to break 50 meters in the discus in 1930, throwing 51.03 m (167 ft  in) at an intercollegiate meet in Palo Alto, California. An earlier throw in the same series also broke the previous world record but was not officially ratified. Two weeks later he won his third IC4A discus title, with a new meeting record of 49.01 m (160 ft  in), but Stanford lost the team championship to University of Southern California. At the NCAA Championships he was surprisingly beaten by Washington's Paul Jessup, who went on to also win the national title that year, breaking Krenz's world record as he did so.

Krenz continued his throwing career after graduating from Stanford, joining the San Francisco Olympic Club. He was considered a favorite for the approaching Summer Olympics in Los Angeles.

Krenz drowned at Lake Tahoe on August 18, 1931. He had been rowing on the lake with a girl when he decided to take a swim; he was stricken by either cramps or a heart attack and drowned, the girl unable to help him.

References

1906 births
1931 deaths
Accidental deaths in California
American male shot putters
American male discus throwers
Athletes (track and field) at the 1928 Summer Olympics
Deaths by drowning in California
Sportspeople from Stockton, California
Stanford Cardinal men's track and field athletes
Olympic track and field athletes of the United States
Track and field athletes from California
World record setters in athletics (track and field)
Boating accident deaths